Three Live Ghosts is a novel by Frederic Isham published in 1918. He adapted it into the 1920 Broadway play of the same name produced by Max Marcin. There were also three film adaptations:

 Three Live Ghosts (1922 film), a British comedy directed by George Fitzmaurice
 Three Live Ghosts (1929 film), an American comedy starring Beryl Mercer
 Three Live Ghosts (1936 film), an American romantic comedy starring Richard Arlen and Beryl Mercer

References

1918 American novels
American novels adapted into plays
American novels adapted into films
Novels by Frederic S. Isham
Bobbs-Merrill Company books
Novels set in London